Paul Madeux was a French film director, film producer and screenwriter.

Filmography 
Production assistant
1935 : Lucrezia Borgia by Abel Gance 

Production director
1932: Mimi Pandore by Roger Capellani
1936:  by Pierre-Jean Ducis
1936: Au son des guitares by Pierre-Jean Ducis
1937: Au soleil de Marseille by Pierre-Jean Ducis
1937: Le Porte-veine by André Berthomieu
1938: Le Petit chose by Maurice Cloche
1938: Le Révolté by Robert Bibal and Léon Mathot
1939: Le Duel by Pierre Fresnay
1939: Le jour se lève by Marcel Carné
1940: L’École des femmes by Max Ophüls (unfinished) 
1941: Parade en sept nuits by Marc Allégret
1942: Une femme disparaît by Jacques Feyder
1946: Last Refuge by Marc Maurette 
1947: Bethsabée by Léonide Moguy 

Assistant director
1927 : The Love of Sunya by Albert Parker

Director
1936  : You Can't Fool Antoinette 

Screenwriter
1938  : Éducation de prince by Alexander Esway

External links 

Fiche dvdtoile
Fiche Cinéma-français
Fiche Encyclociné
Fiche Cinéressources

French film directors
French producers
French screenwriters
Date of birth missing